Capital punishment is a legal penalty in the U.S. state of Arizona. After the execution of Joseph Wood in 2014, executions were temporarily suspended but resumed in 2022. On January 23, 2023, newly inaugurated governor Katie Hobbs ordered a review of death penalty protocols and in light of that, newly inaugurated attorney general Kris Mayes issued a hold on any executions in the state.

Legal process 
When the prosecution seeks the death penalty, the sentence is decided by the jury and must be unanimous.

In case of a hung jury during the penalty phase of the trial, a retrial happens before another jury. If the second jury is also deadlocked, a life sentence is issued.

The Governor of Arizona can grant clemency only with advice and consent of the five-member Arizona Board of Executive Clemency.

Capital crimes 
Certain aggravating circumstances constitute capital murder in the State of Arizona:

 prior conviction for which a sentence of life imprisonment or death was imposable; 
 prior serious offense involving the use of threat or violence;
 grave risk of death to others; 
 procurement of murder by payment or promise of payment; 
commission of murder for pecuniary gain;
 murder committed in an especially heinous, cruel, or depraved manner; 
 murder committed while in custody;
 multiple homicides; 
 murder of a victim under 15 years of age or of a victim 70 years of age or older; and 
 murder of a law enforcement officer.

Executions and death row 
The method of execution employed in Arizona is lethal injection.  However, if convicted for a crime committed prior to November 23, 1992, the inmate may choose gas inhalation instead.

Arizona's death row for males is located at the Arizona State Prison Complex – Florence in Florence.  Female death row prisoners are housed at the Arizona State Prison Complex – Perryville in Goodyear.

Since capital punishment was resumed in 1976, 40 people in Arizona were convicted of murder and have been executed at Florence State Prison in Florence, Arizona.

In October 2019, Arizona's department of corrections paid $1.5m to a confidential source for 1,000 1g vials of pentobarbital sodium salt, a sedative used in the state's executions. U.S. doctors are not permitted to prescribe the drug for executions, as taking a life does not serve a therapeutic purpose, so Arizona has to find suppliers willing to sell drugs without prescription.

In 2011, the state was found to be lawfully buying execution drugs from Dream Pharma, a pharmaceutical company operating out of a driving school in west London, UK.

See also 
 List of people executed in Arizona
 List of death row inmates in Arizona
 Crime in Arizona
 Law of Arizona

References

External links 
 Arizona Department of Corrections -- Death Row and Executions

 
Arizona law
Arizona